, son of Norihira, was a Kugyō or Japanese court noble of the early Edo period (1603–1868). He held regent positions sesshō (from 1664 to 1668) and kampaku (from 1668 to 1682). Kanehiro and Sanesuke were his sons who he had with a daughter of the second head of the Chōshū Domain Mōri Hidenari.

Family 
Parents
Father: Takatsukasa Norihira (鷹司 教平, 14 February 1609 – 7 November 1668)
Mother: Tamemitsu Reizei's daughter (冷泉為満)
Consorts and issues:
Wife: Lady Takeko no Oe (大江竹子,d.1679), Hedenari Mori's daughter (毛利秀就)
Takatsukasa Kanehiro (鷹司 兼熙, 17 January  1659 – 24 December 1725), first son
Saionji Sanesuke (西園寺実輔, 14 June 1661 – 4 February 1685), second son – adopted by Saionji Kinsui (西園寺公遂)
Concubine: Court lady (家女房)
Takatsukasa Sukenobu (鷹司 輔信, 1668 - 1741), third son
Fusa (房演, 1670-1737), fourth son – a Monzeki (japanese Buddhist priest) at  Sanbō-in
Shigaki (信覚, 1674 – 1701), fifth son – a Monzeki (japanese Buddhist priest at Daijō-in
Tazuru (田鶴君, d.1683)  sixth son 
Nikken (日顕, d.1690), seventh son - abbot at Zuiryū-ji (Toyama)
Eight son
Kowaka (小若君, d.1688), ninth son
Ryuuson (隆尊, 1691-1764), tenth son – a priest at Daijō-in
Ichijo Kaneka (一条 兼香, 12 January 1693 – 21 September 1751), eleventh son – adopted by Ichijo Kanetaru

References
  (note: the source claims that a wife of Fusasuke was the "first" head of Chōshū Domain, while actually he was the second.)

1637 births
1700 deaths
Fujiwara clan
Takatsukasa family